Nadine Ann Thomas is a Malaysian British actress, model, and DJ. She was crowned Miss Universe Malaysia 2010 and competed in Miss Universe 2010.

Career 
Thomas is a DJ under tutelage of Malaysian hip hop artist Joe Flizzow. Thomas is the spokesperson for lingerie range Neubodi.

Filmography

References

Malaysian beauty pageant winners
Miss Universe 2010 contestants
1986 births
Living people
Malaysian female models
Miss Universe Malaysia